The Boston–Edison Historic District is a neighborhood located in Detroit, Michigan. It consists of over 900 homes built on four east/west streets: West Boston Boulevard, Chicago Boulevard, Longfellow Avenue, and Edison Avenue, stretching from Woodward Avenue on the east to Linwood Avenue on the west. It is one of the largest residential historic districts in the nation. It is surrounded by Sacred Heart Major Seminary to the west, the Arden Park-East Boston Historic District and the Cathedral of the Most Blessed Sacrament to the east, and the Atkinson Avenue Historic District to the south. The district was designated a Michigan State Historic Site in 1973 and listed on the National Register of Historic Places in 1975.

Description
A substantial number of prominent Detroiters have lived in the neighborhood. Notable residents have included labor leader Walter P. Reuther, Rabbi Morris Adler, Detroit Tigers Harry Heilmann and Dizzy Trout, Michigan Supreme Court justices Franz C. Kuhn and Henry Butzel, U.S. Representative Vincent M. Brennan, Michigan governor Harry Kelly, boxer Joe Louis, druggist Sidney Barthwell, Congressman Charles C. Diggs Jr.,Congressman George D. O'Brien, Motown record label founder Berry Gordy, Detroit Tiger Willie Horton, and dentist and pioneering WCHB radio station owner Wendell F. Cox.

The District boasts the oldest continuous neighborhood association in the City, the Historic Boston–Edison Association, which was founded in 1921. The District received historic designation from the Michigan State Historic Preservation Office in 1973, the Detroit Historic District Commission in 1974, and the National Register of Historic Places in 1975.

Census data from 2000 (which includes the surrounding streets of Atkinson, Clairmount, and Glynn Court) show Boston–Edison has both Black and White residents. The homes are owned by people from diverse occupations and professions.

Architecture

History

The land now within the boundaries of Boston–Edison was first owned by John R. Williams (who was granted a single parcel in 1822) and Thomas Palmer (who was granted three parcels in 1828 and 1832). These original four grants were transferred from owner to owner over the next fifty years until they were obtained by the Joy family, the Newberry family, and Edward W. Voigt.

In 1891, Voigt, foreseeing the growth of Detroit northward, platted out the Voigt Park subdivision, consisting of seven east/west streets between Woodward and Hamilton: Calvert Avenue, Glynn Court, Schiller Esplanade, Shakespeare Esplanade, Longfellow Avenue, Edison Avenue, and Atkinson Avenue. Four of these streets—Schiller Esplanade (now Boston Boulevard), Shakespeare Esplanade (now Chicago Boulevard), Longfellow Avenue, and Edison Avenue—formed the Boston–Edison neighborhood. The location of the neighborhood park was originally to have been between Chicago and Boston Boulevards, but was later changed to be situated between Longfellow and Edison Avenues.

Voigt Park subdivision was immediately incorporated into the City of Detroit. Voigt platted spacious lots and set building restrictions that established the unique character of the neighborhood. His vision was followed by Truman and John Newberry, who platted the West Boston Boulevard Subdivision between Hamilton and 12th Street (now "Rosa Parks Boulevard") in 1913. The subdivision included lots on West Boston, Chicago, Longfellow, and Edison, as well as on Atkinson to the south. In 1915, Henry B. Joy platted the Joy Farms Subdivision between 12th Street and Linwood. This subdivision included lots on the same seven streets originally platted by Voigt. Both of these subdivisions were annexed by the City of Detroit by 1915.

The first homes built in the Boston–Edison Historic District were occupied in 1905, with the majority of the homes built between 1905 and 1925. Each of the homes in the neighborhood is unique. Architectural styles represented include English Tudor revival, Roman and Greek Revival, French Provincial, Colonial Revival, Italian Renaissance, Prairie Style, and Vernacular. These homes range in size from modest two-story vernaculars to massive mansions set on sprawling grounds. Although the homes are unique in style, homes along the streetscape are generally uniform in roofline, scale, setback from the street, and in the use of stone, brick or wood construction. This uniformity creates a gracious suburban ambiance.

Original residents

One of the earliest residents of the Boston–Edison neighborhood, Henry Ford, was also one of the most well-known. In 1907, Ford had a brick and limestone Italian Renaissance Revival residence built at the corner of Edison and Second at a cost of $483,253. Ford and his wife, Clara, moved in the next year, living in the neighborhood until 1915, when they relocated to Fair Lane, their estate in Dearborn. During the time that Ford lived in Boston–Edison, his introduction of the Model T, mass production methods, and wage-price theories revolutionized American industry. Above the garage (behind the house), Henry Ford built a machine shop for his son Edsel to support and encourage Edsel's interest in automobile design. A State of Michigan Historical Marker, describing the history and significance of the home, is located on the front lawn.

Henry Ford was only the first of many automotive pioneers to live in the Boston–Edison community. Ford's early business partners and Ford Motor Company stockholders James Couzens and Horace Rackham also built homes near Ford's in Boston–Edison. (Two other Ford stockholders, John Dodge, and Alexander Y. Malcomson, lived in the adjoining Arden Park-East Boston neighborhood.) They were followed by other early and important Ford collaborators such as Peter E. Martin, C. Harold Wills, and Clarence W. Avery. In addition, other early automobile pioneers such as Walter Briggs Sr. of Briggs Manufacturing Co, four of the Fisher brothers (of Fisher Body), Charles Lambert of Regal Motor Car Co., John W. Drake of Hupp Motor Car Co., and William E. Metzger of Cadillac and E-M-F. likewise built homes in Boston–Edison.

Other prominent Detroit businessmen lived in Boston–Edison during the early years of the neighborhood, including Sebastian S. Kresge (founder of the S.S. Kresge Company—later Kmart), Benjamin Siegel (founder of a major early clothing store), and J. L. Webber (nephew of J. L. Hudson). Other notable early residents included conductor Ossip Gabrilowitsch and his wife Clara Clemens, Detroit Tigers owner Frank Navin, Detroit Tigers player Ty Cobb (on nearby Atkinson Avenue at Third), historian Clarence M. Burton, and Rabbi Leo M. Franklin.

During the early history of Boston–Edison, three factors influenced the character of the community. First was a tendency for employees and business associates to live in a cluster, as early associates of Henry Ford did. In addition, six employees of S.S. Kresge lived in the neighborhood. Secondly, was the tendency of several family members to live in close range. In addition to the four Fisher brothers (a fifth brother, Frederic, lived in the adjacent Arden Park-East Boston neighborhood), a number of Benjamin Siegel's relatives lived in the neighborhood, as did a number of Wagner family members (owners of Wagner's bakery). A third factor was the construction of Henry Ford Hospital in 1915, only a mile south of the neighborhood. Twenty-three physicians built homes in Boston–Edison.

Education
Residents are zoned to schools in the Detroit Public Schools district. Durfee K-8 and Loving and Thirkell elementary schools serve separate sections of the neighborhood for elementary school. All of Boston–Edison is zoned to Durfee K-8 for middle school. All residents are zoned to Central High School.

Previously Hutchins Middle School served portions of Boston–Edison.

References

External links

Historic Boston–Edison Association: neighborhood website
Photos from Detroit Rising
Photos from National Scenic Byways

Historic districts on the National Register of Historic Places in Michigan
Neighborhoods in Detroit
Michigan State Historic Sites in Wayne County, Michigan
National Register of Historic Places in Detroit
Historic district contributing properties in Michigan
Culture of Detroit